Rattlesnake Mountain is the name of 55 summits in the United States alone, including:

Alabama

 Rattlesnake Mountain,	Cleburne, Alabama

Arkansas

 Rattlesnake Mountain,	Saline, Arkansas
 Rattlesnake Mountain,	Polk, Arkansas

California

 Rattlesnake Mountain,	Placer, California
 Rattlesnake Mountain,	Siskiyou, California
 Rattlesnake Mountain,	Del Norte, California
 Rattlesnake Mountain, San Bernardino, California
 Rattlesnake Mountain, Fire Department Oak Springs, San Bernardino, California
 Rattlesnake Mountain,	Tierra Del Sol, California
 Rattlesnake Mountain, Santee/Lakeside, California

Colorado

 Rattlesnake Mountain,	Fremont, Colorado

Connecticut

 Rattlesnake Mountain, Farmington, Connecticut

Maine

 Rattlesnake Mountain, Porter, Maine
 Rattlesnake Mountain, Raymond, Maine
 Rattlesnake Mountain, Stoneham, Maine

Massachusetts

 Rattlesnake Mountain, also known as Farley Ledges, a bluff on the southeast side of Northfield Mountain in Erving, Massachusetts
 Rattlesnake Mountain, Wales, Massachusetts

Nevada

 Rattlesnake Mountain, Elko County
 Rattlesnake Mountain, Reno

New Hampshire

 Rattlesnake Mountain, Alton, New Hampshire
 Rattlesnake Mountain, North Conway, New Hampshire
 Rattlesnake Mountain, Ossipee, New Hampshire
 Rattlesnake Mountain, Rumney, New Hampshire
 Rattlesnake Mountain, West Swanzey, New Hampshire
 West Rattlesnake Mountain, Holderness, New Hampshire
 East Rattlesnake Mountain, Sandwich, New Hampshire

Virginia
 Rattlesnake Mountain, Fauquier County, Virginia

Washington

 Rattlesnake Mountain, Benton County, Washington
 Rattlesnake Mountain, part of Rattlesnake Ridge, King County, Washington

Wyoming

 Rattlesnake Mountain, Buffalo Bill State Park, Wyoming

Other variations of the name include 
 Rattlesnake Knob, a peak on Mount Norwottuck in Massachusetts
 The Rattlesnakes (East Rattlesnake and West Rattlesnake), a pair of rocky hills in the Squam Range of New Hampshire
 Rattlesnake Point (USA), a mountain summit in Texas, USA
 Rattlesnake Mountains (Montana), a subrange of the Rocky Mountains in western Montana

Folk Music
 Rattlesnake Mountain is a traditional American folk song.

References
USBGN. Cited Dec. 19, 2007